Zevi is both a surname and a given name. Notable people with the name include:

Bruno Zevi (1918–2000), Italian architect, historian, professor, curator, writer and editor
Fausto Zevi, Italian archaeologist
Sabbatai Zevi (1626–1676), Ottoman rabbi
Tullia Zevi (1919–2011), Italian journalist and writer
Zevi Wolmark (born 1962), American actor